The 2016–17 Montana State Bobcats men's basketball team represented Montana State University during the 2016–17 NCAA Division I men's basketball season. The Bobcats, led by third year head coach Brian Fish, played their home games at Brick Breeden Fieldhouse in Bozeman, Montana as members of the Big Sky Conference. They finished the season 16–16, 11–7 in Big Sky play to finish in a tie for fifth place. As the No. 6 seed in the Big Sky tournament, they lost in the first round to Southern Utah.

Previous season
The Bobcats finished the 2015–16 season 14–17, 9–9 in Big Sky play to finish in seventh place. They lost in the first round of the Big Sky tournament to Sacramento State.

Offseason

Departures

Incoming transfers

2016 incoming recruits

Roster

Schedule and results

|-
!colspan=9 style=| Exhibition

|-
!colspan=9 style=| Non-conference regular season

|-
!colspan=9 style=| Big Sky regular season

|-
!colspan=9 style=| Big Sky tournament

See also
 2016–17 Montana State Bobcats women's basketball team

References

Montana State Bobcats men's basketball seasons
Montana State
Bob
Bob